U.S. Route 366 was the designation for two U.S. Numbered Highways in the United States, both of which were related to U.S. Route 66:

 U.S. Route 366 (1927–1932), a route connecting El Paso and Amarillo in Texas, by way of Clovis, New Mexico
 U.S. Route 366 (1932–1939), a route connecting Albuquerque and Willard in New Mexico

See also

 List of United States Numbered Highways

External links

366
3